Peter Ross Schulze (6 November 1935 – 21 May 2019) was an Australian politician.

He was born in Queenstown, Tasmania, and qualified with a Diploma of Electrical Engineering. In 1988 he was elected to the Tasmanian Legislative Council as the independent member for Gordon, serving until the seat's abolition in 1999, at which time he retired.

References

1935 births
2019 deaths
Independent members of the Parliament of Tasmania
Members of the Tasmanian Legislative Council
20th-century Australian politicians